"Feels Like the First Time" is the 1977 debut single by the British-American rock band Foreigner.

Feels Like the First Time may also refer to:

Songs
"Feels Like the First Time" (Sinitta song), written J. G. Hargreaves 1986
"Feels Like the First Time", by Pepsi and Shirlie from All Right Now, 1987
"Feels Like the First Time", by Beverley Craven from Love Scenes, 1993
"Feels Like the First Time", by Intro, 1995
"Feels Like the First Time", by Corinne Bailey Rae from album The Sea, 2010 
"Feels like the First Time", by Reborn from Finding Favour, 2015

Other uses
Feels Like The First Time, 2009 novel by Tawny Weber